Michal Gottwald  (born 29 April 1981 in Čadca) is a Slovak football forward who currently plays for FK Slávia Staškov.

Club career
Gottwald has previously played for FK Dukla Banská Bystrica, MŠK Žilina and ŠK Slovan Bratislava in the Slovak Superliga. He had a spell in the Greek Super League with OFI Crete and in the Greek Beta Ethniki with Agios Nikolaos F.C. He also had a brief spell with Legia Warsaw in the Polish Ekstraklasa.

References

1981 births
Living people
People from Čadca
Sportspeople from the Žilina Region
Slovak footballers
Slovak Super Liga players
MŠK Žilina players
ŠK Slovan Bratislava players
FK Dukla Banská Bystrica players
OFI Crete F.C. players
Agios Nikolaos F.C. players
Ekstraklasa players
Legia Warsaw players
FK Železiarne Podbrezová players
MFK Karviná players
Slovak expatriate footballers
Expatriate footballers in Greece
Slovak expatriate sportspeople in Greece
Expatriate footballers in Poland
Slovak expatriate sportspeople in Poland

Association football forwards